Bashundhara is an upscale residential area in Dhaka, Bangladesh. The area is developed by Bashundhara Group.

The project of Basundhara was started in the 1980s. In 2011 portions of the housing project was declared illegal as they were considerable flood flow zones of Dhaka. In 2014 a cabinet committee changed the Dhaka detailed plan to make the project legal. The project was built on area made by filling low-lying marshland and flood flow zones. The project has sold over 10,000 residential plots as of 2005.

Commercial

 Walton Group, electronics and electrical goods manufacturer.
 Grameenphone- the headquarters of the company are located in the area.
 Bashundhara Group headquarters and corporate office are located here.
 Bangladesh Pratidin - the highest circulated newspaper in Bangladesh.

Education
 American International University Bangladesh (AIUB)
 Islamic Research Center Bangladesh 
 Independent University, Bangladesh (IUB)
 North South University (NSU)
 International School Dhaka.
Playpen (school). 
Hurdco International School.
Viqarunnisa Noon School and College

Medical
 Evercare Hospital Dhaka
 Bashundhara Eye Hospital

References

Dhaka District
Neighbourhoods in Dhaka
Planned cities in Bangladesh